The 2019–20 Mumbai City FC season was the club's sixth season since its establishment in 2014 and their sixth season in the Indian Super League.

Players

Current squad

Out on Loan

  (to  Mohun Bagan A.C. until 31 May 2020)

Competitions

Indian Super League

League table

Results by matchday

Matches
League stage

Indian Super Cup

References

Mumbai City FC seasons
Mumbai City